Qiu Jun may refer to:
 Qiu Jun (poet) (1421–1495), Chinese playwright and politician, member of the Hanlin Academy
 Qiu Jun (bodybuilder) (1948–2020), Chinese bodybuilder
 Qiu Jun (go player) (born 1982), Chinese go player

See also
 25042 Qiujun, a minor planet named for a Chinese engineer